Mariusz Fyrstenberg and Marcin Matkowski were the defending champions, but were eliminated in the first round by Jonathan Erlich and Andy Ram who won the tournament.

The final was first abandoned due to rain, but eventually played with Erlich and Ram defeating Grigor Dimitrov and Andreas Seppi in the final,

Seeds

Draw

Draw

References
 Main Draw

Aegon International - Doubles
Doubles